Llorío is one of nine parishes (administrative divisions) in Laviana, a municipality within the province and autonomous community of Asturias, in northern Spain.

Villages 
 L'Acebal
 La Cabaña
 Ciargüelo
 La Fomermeya
 Iguanzo
 La Llera
 Muñera
 Pando
 Payandi
 El Puente d'Arcu
 Ribota
 Soto
 La Canterona
 La Curuxera

Parishes in Laviana